
Gmina Cieszanów is an urban-rural gmina (administrative district) in Lubaczów County, Subcarpathian Voivodeship, in south-eastern Poland.

The gmina contains part of the protected area called Puszcza Solska Landscape Park.

Villages
Apart from the town of Cieszanów, Gmina Cieszanów contains the villages and settlements of Chotylub, Dąbrówka, Dachnów, Folwarki, Gorajec, Kowalówka, Niemstów, Nowe Sioło, Nowy Lubliniec, Stary Lubliniec and Żuków.

Neighbouring gminas
Gmina Cieszanów is bordered by the gminas of Horyniec-Zdrój and Obsza.

References

Polish official population figures 2006

Cieszanow
Lubaczów County